Peter Joseph Serukamba (born 6 June 1972) is a Tanzanian CCM politician and Member of Parliament for Kigoma Town constituency since 2010.

References

1972 births
Living people
Chama Cha Mapinduzi MPs
Tanzanian MPs 2010–2015
Institute of Finance Management alumni
Eastern and Southern African Management Institute alumni
Maastricht University alumni